MSCHF (pronounced "mischief") is an American art collective based in Brooklyn, New York, United States. MSCHF has produced a wide range of artworks, ranging from browser plugins to sneakers, physical products, social media channels and AI generated foot photographs.

History
The group was founded in 2016 by Gabriel Whaley, who acts as its CEO. As of January 2020, MSCHF was reported to have received $11.5 million USD in funding. The group operates as a company under the name MSCHF Product Studio, Inc.

Josh Wardle, the Welsh software engineer who created the web-based word game Wordle, joined MSCHF in December 2021.

Releases
The group announces the availability of their work in numbered "drops".  In May 2018 MSCHF released its first work, titled The Persistence of Chaos. The work was a single 2008 Windows laptop loaded with six malware programs. The programs included were those that had purportedly caused nearly $100 billion dollars in damage to the global economy.

A November 2019 release called Puff the Squeaky Chicken consisted of a rubber chicken that was also a functional bong.

An April 2020 release called Severed Spots involved the purchase of a $30,000 USD Damien Hirst spot print. After purchasing the work, MSCHF cut the individual spots out of the print, selling them for $480 each. A second work consisting of the leftover paper, titled 88 Holes, sold for $261,400 USD.

In 2020, the group released a dog collar called Cuss Collar that turns a dog's barking into spoken swear words.

In June 2020 MSCHF and MrBeast released a one-time multiplayer mobile game titled "Finger on the App". In the game, players touch their phone screen and the last person to remove their finger from the screen wins $25,000. Four people ended up winning $20,000 each after keeping their finger on the app for over 70 hours. The game was reportedly so successful that a sequel titled "Finger on the App 2" was released in March 2021, featuring a grand prize of $100,000. The winner kept their finger on the phone screen for around 51 hours; the second-place finisher also received a prize of $20,000.

In September 2020 MSCHF released a series of paintings that were enlargements of medical bills received by American citizens. The paintings were sold for $78,000 USD, and the proceeds used to pay down the bills the work was built upon.

In February 2021 the group purchased a Boston Dynamics robot dog, and mounted a paintball gun on it. The robot was used in a live performance that allowed users of the MSCHF app to control the robot and its paintball gun. After MSCHF publicly criticized the potential use of robotic dogs by police forces, Boston Dynamics released a statement criticizing the use of the robot in an artwork.

Also in February 2021, MSCHF purchased four Birkin bags and used them to make sandals, dubbed Birkinstocks after the Birkenstock brand of shoes. The shoes sold for between $34,000 and $76,000 USD, depending on the size of shoe purchased.

In March 2021 the group released Axe No 5, a mashup of Axe Body Spray and Chanel No. 5 perfume.

Also, on March 29, 2021, MSCHF partnered with Lil Nas X, to release a pair of modified Nike Air Max 97 shoes called Satan Shoes, in an edition of 666. The shoes sold for $1,018 USD, in an apparent reference to Bible verse Luke 10:18. They featured a reversed bronze pentagram, an inverted cross and a drop of real human blood in their sole and sold out in the first minutes of being available for sale. The shoes garnered significant controversy, which led Nike to announce that they were suing MSCHF for trademark infringement and dilution. In Nike's complaint against MSCHF and Lil Nas X, the brand argued that it had "suffered harm to its goodwill, including among consumers who believe that Nike is endorsing satanism." The two companies came to a settlement in April 2021 after a U.S. District Court in Brooklyn granted Nike a temporary restraining order against MSCHF. As part of the settlement, MSCHF agreed to accept returns of the Satan Shoes. 

In July 2021, MSCHF released Dead Startup Toys. The drop included miniature "toy" versions of the Juicero juicer, the One Laptop Per Child (OLPC) rugged laptop, Theranos miniLab, Jibo social robot, and the Coolest Cooler.

In October 2021 the collective offered the original Andy Warhol drawing "Fairies", which they had purchased for $20,000, along with 999 high-quality forgeries they produced, for $250 apiece. Having mixed the fakes with the lone original, MSCHF claimed not to know which was the real Warhol. Each of the forgeries and also the lone original were (re)titled "Possibly Real Copy of 'Fairies' by Andy Warhol".

In December 2021, they released Tontine, a morbid sort of betting pool loosely based on the 17th century investment scheme of the same name. Participants enter $10 dollars into the pot and then must log in every day lest they be eliminated. The last person remaining gets the pot. 

In January 2022, MSCHF released OnlyBags. The drop consisted of a website where users could browse and purchase shopping bags from luxury brands. All bags sold out in under a minute.

In February 2023, MSCHF has been trending on all platforms after revealing its upcoming drop the Big Red Boots. The Big Red Boots released on Feb. 16 at 11 a.m. ET at mschf.com and on the MSCHF Sneakers app for $350.

Full Drop List

References

External links 
 

American artist groups and collectives
Arts organizations established in 2016
American conceptual artists
Institutional Critique artists
Organizations based in Brooklyn
Industrial design